Moesgaard Museum (MOMU) is a Danish regional museum dedicated to archaeology and ethnography. It is located in Beder, a suburb of Aarhus, Denmark.

MOMU cooperates with the Institute of Prehistoric Archaeology, Medieval and Renaissance Archaeology and Anthropology at Aarhus University. The main part of the museum's archaeological collection is of Danish origin. In addition, the Ethnographical Collections contain almost 50,000 artifacts from all over the world. They are used both for research and exhibitions. The collection also contains photographic material, films and sound recordings. The museum's exhibitions presents several unrivaled archaeological findings from Denmark's ancient past, among  others the Grauballe Man, the world's best preserved bog body and the large ritual weapon caches from Illerup Ådal, testifying the power struggles and warfare of the Iron Age. The collection also contains seven local rune stones.
Temporary exhibitions at the museum also display examples of the world's cultural heritage.

Exhibitions 
A large new museum building, designed by Henning Larsen Architects, housing both exhibitions for the public and headquarters for academic activities, was inaugurated in 2014.
The museum building is constructed around a broad central staircase. The upper levels shows changing exhibits of history and culture from around the world, while the lower levels house the permanent exhibitions on Danish, Scandinavian and European history and culture.

The permanent indoor exhibitions comprise the Stone Age, Bronze Age, Iron Age and Viking Age as it unfolded in Denmark and Scandinavia specifically and an exhibition on Medieval Denmark in c. 1050 to 1536. They are highly interactive in several languages, designed to appeal to as broad an audience as possible, without losing academic depth and accuracy. The prehistoric exhibitions includes these notable artifacts:

 Model of a large Bronze Age barrow, "Borum Eshøj"
 Thousands of items from the Iron-Age votive site at Illerup Ådal
 Copies of the Golden horns of Gallehus (Guldhornene)
 Grauballe Man, a bog body from Grauballe, Denmark
 Various runestones, including the Mask stone (Maskestenen)
 Snaptun stone, often identified as a depiction of Loki
 Hørning Church, a reconstructed early Danish stave church

The historical landscape 
 

As an open-air museum, the landscape surrounding Moesgaard Museum displays different epochs and eras of Denmark's past, from ancient to modern times. A larger part of the woodlands represents different prehistoric climatic epochs of the Holocene, and a number of reconstructed buildings are strewn across the landscape, stretching all the way to the beach and shores in the east. The buildings include several relocated tumuli from the neolithic and the Bronze Age, houses from the early Iron Age and Viking Age, and several Medieval buildings, some of which are still in use.

Stave-church and Viking houses  
Just south of the new museum building, two houses and Hørning Church, a stave-church from the Viking Period have been built. First is a house from the Viking Age town of Hedeby near Schleswig, Germany. It has been dated around 870 AD and is interpreted as the home of a craftsman's or trader's family. The other house is a reconstruction of a pit-house from Viking Age Aarhus, dated to about 900 AD. Pit-houses are small huts, dug half-way into the ground, used as dwellings, workshops or storerooms.

On a small hill behind the houses, a stave church has been erected with a bell frame. None of the original stave churches in Denmark have survived, but the floor and post-holes from a Viking Age stave church were excavated under the present Hørning Church near Randers in 1960. Compared to the medieval stone churches, it was a quite small building; 31 feet long and 15 feet wide. Also preserved from the stave church in Hørning was a portion of the so-called hammer-beam, the horizontal beam just under the roof-projection, which held the vertical planks. The "Hørning-plank" was found as early as 1887 during a restoration of the walling of the present church. It can be seen in the Danish National Museum. On the outside, the hammer-beam from Hørning was ornamented with writhing serpents, a characteristic of the Late Viking Period. On the basis of the growth-rings in the timber, the stave-church has been dated to about 1060, the transition from the Viking Age Period to the Middle Ages.

At the excavation site in Hørning, traces of a bell frame were discovered. This has also been reconstructed just in front of the church entrance. The church bell has been cast at Moesgaard, following a 900-year-old description of bell casting. It is a replica of the almost 800-year-old bell from Smollerup church near Viborg.

Moesgaard Manor and surroundings 
The estate of Moesgaard covers 100 hectares of park, forest, open fields and shoreline, and extends from the museum buildings down to the Bay of Aarhus. The former manor house at Moesgaard Manor was constructed in 1780–84 by nobleman and diplomat  Christian Frederik Gyldenkrone (1741–1788), based upon plans by architect Christian Joseph Zuber (1736–1802).  Torkild Christian Dahl (1807–1872) took ownership of the manor  in 1844. In 1960 Århus County bought the manor and estate.   The former manor house now houses a department of the Institutes of Archaeology and Anthropology of Aarhus University.

In the park is also a house from Thailand which was donated to Moesgaard Museum by the Kingdom of Thailand in 1975. The house is around 100 years old and originally from Ayutthaya, the old capital of Siam, 200 km north of Bangkok. The house was once a part of a larger building complex.

From the manor park, a 4 km long Prehistoric Track starts off, running through the estate all the way to the sea in the east. A short walk from the park, an Iron Age house has been reconstructed. It is a typical farmhouse from 200 to 300 AD, based on a settlement at Tofting near Husum, just south of the Danish border. This house-type was common throughout Northern Europe in its day. The building is 16 m long and both humans and cattle lived under the same roof.

The open fields and slopes below the manor are grazed by sheep, goats and horses, and present a handful of ancient tumuli. In the forest of Moesgaard Skov further east, it is possible to visit the old timber-framed Medieval water mill of  Moesgård Forest Mill (Skovmøllen), powered by the stream of Giber Å. The first reference to the mill dates from 1590 but all the buildings were rebuilt and an overshot mill-wheel was installed in 1785. An extra story was added to the mill house in 1852. Production ceased in 1910, but the mill is still in full working order as both a saw and granary mill. The milling business was initiated again by a team of volunteers in 2000 and guided tours are held throughout the year. There is a restaurant in the attached buildings and Skovmøllen has a long history of recreational activities.

Near Moesgaard Beach is a reconstruction of a Stone Age cult-building from the Funnel Beaker Period, around 2500 BC. The original house was located near two dolmens and a passage grave at Tustrup in Northern Djursland. It is believed that the building served religious ceremonies – perhaps as a resting place for the dead, until the flesh had decayed and the bones could be moved into surrounding graves. The original wooden building burnt to the ground at some point, and parts of the roof sheeting of birch-bark with turf cover collapsed inwards with the burnt wall planking. 26 richly decorated offering vessels and pottery ladles representing the golden age of pottery in Danish prehistory were found inside the collapsed building. The ceramics can be seen on display at the Moesgaard Museum.

Further east, at the mouth of the Giber Å stream on the beach, is an old fisherman's house from 1856. The residents used to serve the estate until 1935, when Aarhus Municipality acquired the land. Moesgård beach is popular in the summer with people looking for a sunbath, recreational watersport activities or a place for picnics. Public toilets and a kiosk selling ice-cream and fast food can be found here.

In 2019, the landscape around Moesgaard Museum was used for the IAAF 2019 Cross Country World Championships. The route included the museum buildings grass covered roof.

Prehistoric Trail

The Prehistoric Trail is a 4 km trail that runs from the Moesgaard Manor to the beach and back transecting most of the 100 hectare area of garden, park, forest, fields and beaches that is owned by the Moesgaard Museum. Along the route are several reconstructed prehistoric buildings and burial mounds. The trail also passes through the Prehistoric Forest, an area divided into sections representing the successive forest types of Denmark since the ice sheets of the last ice age retreated. Points of interests – both historical and biological – are explained on information boards.

For the most part the trail is marked by large white stones adorned with a red dot.

The Prehistoric Trail leads you through the baroque-styled Manor Park, laid out around the same time Moesgaard Manor was constructed (in the 1770s) down to the field shown on maps as "Jens Michelsens toft". Here are several stone burial chambers from various parts of Denmark illustrating how traditions of burial changed over time during the Stone and Bronze Ages. These were relocated here and carefully reconstructed when their original sites were lost to development. The field is grazed by Gotland sheep in the summer to keep the vegetation around the burial chambers down.

The next points of interest along the trail include the old watermill, which today also houses a restaurant, and the ruin of a long barrow. The route then leads into the ancient woodland, the forest swamp, which is crossed on a footbridge. Among the Red Alders are tussocks rich in herbs. The trail continues through The Prehistoric Forest, which the museum planted in 1964 to illustrate the ecological succession in the forests of Denmark from the Stone Age until today. Thus the forest is divided into the periods Birch and Pine period (9550–8250 BC), Hazel and Pine (8250–7500 BC), Early Lime (7000–3800 BC), Late Lime (3800–700 BC) og Beech (700 BC – today). The trail exits the Beech period close to the beach.

From the beach the trail leads back west through the forest past reconstructed houses including The Tustrup House. The original house was located in the town of Tustrup on the peninsula of Djursland north of Aarhus. This house was probably used for religious ceremonies and perhaps for storing dead bodies until all that remained was bones, which could then be placed in a passage grave or stone barrow. The Prehistoric Trail ends back at the Manor, which nowadays houses the museum administration, Aarhus University offices and student facilities. There is no public access to these buildings. However just across the road is the last point of interest on The Prehistoric Trail, the reconstructed stave church from a town about 35 km to the north of Moesgaard.

Gallery

Gallery

Directors
Directors of Moesgaard Museum have included:

 Peder Mortensen (1982–1996)
 Jan Skamby Madsen (1996–2016)
 Mads Kähler Holst (from 2016)

See also
 Endebjerg, a 2018 excavation project by the Museum on the nearby island of Samsø
 Moesgård Vikingetræf

References

Other sources
Skriver, Jens B. (2001) Moesgård – historien om en herregård (Moesgård Museum)

External links

Official website

 
Archaeological museums in Denmark
History museums in Denmark
Viking Age museums
Museums in Aarhus
Tourist attractions in Aarhus
Cross country running venues
Museums established in 1970
1970 establishments in Denmark